Vidyasagar Shishu Niketan is a primary and higher secondary English-medium school in Midnapore in West Bengal, India, established in 1975. Spread across two campuses in the city, the school is run by the Society for the Betterment of Education, a local voluntary group. Students are prepared for the Indian Certificate of Secondary Education (ICSE) and the Indian School Certificate (ISC).

History  
The Society for the Betterment of Education was formed by a group of educationists and administrators on 4 September 1974 with the help of Sri Dipak Ghosh I.A.S, the then District Magistrate of Midnapore, to impart better education to the school going children of Midnapore and to establish institutions for this purpose. This group felt that children should be able to feel at home anywhere in India during their student life and also later in their working life. For this reason, they decided to set up a school where education would be imparted through the medium of English.

Vidyasagar Shishu Niketan was established in January 1975 with preparatory and kindergarten classes only, under the guidance of Miss S. Mukherjee, Honorary Secretary and Principal. Since 1975, the school grew up by one class each year until 1983. The School from its very inception depended solely on the tuition and other fees collected from its students.

Governance
Vidyasagar Shishu Niketan is managed by a Governing Body, appointed by the Society for the Betterment of Education. This Society and its members take interest in the business of the school without any remuneration whatsoever. The Society is under the direct supervision of the District Magistrate and the School Governing Body is constituted by the Society. The School is permanently affiliated to the Council for the Indian School Certificate Examinations.

Educational provision
The School is now run in four sections: Pre-school section (Lower & Upper prep. & K.G. Classes); Primary school section (classes I to IV); High school section (Classes V to X); Higher Secondary (XI & XII).

Thirteen batches of students have already taken the final ICSE examination quite successfully. Three batches of ISC have appeared quite successfully.

See also
Education in India
List of schools in India
Education in West Bengal

References

External links

Primary schools in West Bengal
High schools and secondary schools in West Bengal
Schools in Paschim Medinipur district
Educational institutions established in 1975
1975 establishments in West Bengal